Darren McCartney was the Suffragan Bishop of The Arctic from 2012 to 2019.

McCartney was ordained in 2004 and began his career as priest in charge of Pangnirtung. He also served in Carrickfergus and Knocknamuckley before his ordination to the episcopate.

Notes

21st-century Anglican Church of Canada bishops
Living people
Year of birth missing (living people)
Anglican bishops of The Arctic